Vinyl ether may refer to:

  Any enol ether
 Divinyl ether, a volatile chemical compound once used as an anestethic